The 2014–15 ETC Superliga was the 21st season of the Kosovo Basketball Superleague, also called ETC Superliga in its sponsored identity it's the highest professional basketball league in Kosovo 

The regular season started on 12 October 2014 and finished on 29 April 2015, after all teams had played 28 games. The 4 best ranked teams advanced to the play-off phase whilst KB Kastrioti was relegated to the Liga e Parë e Kosoves ne Baskbetboll after finishing last in the league table.

The play-offs started on 24 April 2015 and finished on 6 May 2015, Sigal Prishtina won their 10th title by beating KB Peja by an official decision from the BFK because in the game 3 of the final at the result 1-1 of the finals, Peja decided to leave the field for unexplained reasons. Therefore, Basketball Federation of Kosovo gave Sigal Prishtina the title by an official decision and KB Peja was relegated to the Liga e Parë and fined 10,000 euros. Also KB Besa, due to some issues with some documents from the previews season also got an penalty to be exclusion from the Superleague.

Regular season 

|}

Playoffs 
Same as last year, the semi-finals were played in a best-of-four format.

Awards
MVP:  Dardan Berisha – Sigal Prishtina
Finals MVP:  Dardan Berisha – Sigal Prishtina
Foreigner MVP:  Jordan Hulls – Sigal Prishtina
Coach of the Year:  Marjan Ilievski – Sigal Prishtina

References 

Kosovo Basketball Superleague seasons
Kosovo
2014–15 in Kosovan basketball